Mesonia oceanica is a Gram-negative, aerobic, rod-shaped, chemoorganotrophic, slightly halophilic and non-motile bacterium from the genus of Mesonia which has been isolated from seawater from the Atlantic.

References

Flavobacteria
Bacteria described in 2020